Jeffrey N. Spiegelman is an American politician and a Republican member of the Delaware House of Representatives since January 8, 2013 representing District 11.

Elections
2012 When Republican Representative Gregory Lavelle ran for Delaware Senate and left the District 11 seat open, Spiegelman was unopposed for the September 11, 2012 Republican Primary and won with 4,192 votes, and won the three-way November 6, 2012 General election with 4,337 votes (50.3%) against Democratic nominee Lynne Newlin and Libertarian nominee Margaret McKeown.

References

External links
Official page at the Delaware General Assembly
Campaign site
 

Place of birth missing (living people)
Year of birth missing (living people)
Living people
Republican Party members of the Delaware House of Representatives
21st-century American politicians